Boydaş is a village in the Hozat District, Tunceli Province, Turkey. The village was unpopulated as of 2022.

The hamlets of Aliağa, Aşlama, Avgülü, Boytaşkozluca, Bozan, Dalikhem, Damlacık, Değirmendere, Dereköy, Dursunderesi, Gangırus, Hanımlar, Kaş, Kızılkum, Kozluca, Odunlu, Oğulcuk, Ormanyolu, Ortaköy, Oymaklı, Sakaltutan, Sapanca, Tekneli, Toptaş, Uzuntarla, Veliağa, Yağcılar and Yenibaş are attached to the village.

Population 
The village was populated by Kurds of the Ferhadan tribe.

The village had a population of 13 in 2020, 15 in 2019, 1 in 2018 and unpopulated in 2017.

References 

Kurdish settlements in Tunceli Province
Villages in Hozat District
Unpopulated villages in Turkey